Otilia Larrañaga Villarreal (3 November 1931 – 6 October 2021) was a Mexican dancer and actress who participated in classic Mexican films during the Golden Age of Mexican cinema and also on stage and television.

Biography 
Larrañaga studied dance with her uncle Ignacio Larrañaga and later ballet with Lettie H. Carroll. From 1947 to 1950, she was a member of Carroll's dance group and participated in the seasons of the Palacio de Bellas Artes' National Opera in Mexico City.

A notable dancer by the time she was 15, she began her film career in the early 1950s with small roles in Secretaria particular (1952) and No te ofendas, Beatriz (1953).

One of her first successes was her performance in the play Ángeles y payasos (1952), directed by Luz Alba at the Teatro Esperanza Iris. The theater critic Armando de María y Campos wrote that "the best performance rests in Otilia Larrañaga, as an actress and dancer, beautiful in figure and exquisite in feeling. Her future is splendid, whatever path she chooses".

She met her first husband, singer and actor Antonio "Tony" Aguilar, at the XEW-TV station in 1952. Larrañaga and Aguilar performed together in the films Mi papá tuvo la culpa (1953) and Reventa de esclavas (1954).

She obtained her first starring role in the film La flecha envenenada (1957) with Gastón Santos.

In 1957, she received a nomination for the Ariel Award for Best Youth Performance for the film Caras nuevas (1956).

She married Antonio Aguilar and after their divorce in 1968, she married her second husband, actor Rogelio Guerra, with whom she had a daughter named Hildegard. They divorced in 1974.

Filmography 

 Secretaria particular
 No te ofendas, Beatriz
 Mi papá tuvo la culpa
 The Price of Living (1954)
 Reventa de esclavas
 Maldita ciudad
 Las viudas del cha-cha-cha
 Caras nuevas
 La flecha envenenada
 La locura del rock and roll

References

External links 
 

1931 births
2021 deaths
Mexican film actresses
Mexican female dancers
Mexican television actresses
Mexican stage actresses
Mexican ballerinas
20th-century Mexican dancers
20th-century Mexican actresses
Actresses from Mexico City